Van Leer may refer to:

Places in the United States
 VanLeer, Tennessee, an old iron works town named after Anthony Van Leer
 Van Leer Cabin, an 18th-century cabin in Chester County, Pennsylvania
 Van Leer House, an 18th-century house in Delaware County, Pennsylvania
 Van Leer Pleasant Hill Plantation, an 18th-century stone farmhouse near Glen Moore, Pennsylvania
 Van Leer Building, a building on the main campus of the Georgia Institute of Technology
 Broadview VanLeer Mansion, a 1906 mansion in McLean County, Illinois
 Mortonson-Van Leer Log Cabin, historic cabin in Swedesboro, Cumberland County, New Jersey

Other uses
 Van Leer (surname)
 Bernard Van Leer Foundation, a Dutch organization that promotes work in early childhood development and children's rights
 Van Leer Jerusalem Institute, established in 1959
 Van Leer Packaging, a packaging company which was acquired by Huhtamäki in 1999
 Van Leer Factory, a listed building in Dundee, Scotland

See also
 Van Lear (disambiguation)